Bangladesh Institute of Legal Development (BiLD) is a legal research institute based in Bangladesh. It was founded in 2016 with association of Azad & Company, a corporate law firm of Bangladesh.

The main concern of Bangladesh Institute of Legal Development is to promote the legal education of the country. The Institute works on development of various legal issues by publishing books, journals, magazines, law reports, digests, etc.

History 
Bangladesh Institute of Legal Development (BiLD) was established on 24 April 2016.

Publications 

BiLD publishes various books, a law journal and a magazine. BiLD Law Journal is a peer reviewed double blind law journal for academicians, researchers and practitioners. It also has a quarterly law magazine named BiLD Law Magazine, core philosophy of which is to improve legal knowledge among general public.

Administration

 Md. Abul Kalam Azad, founder and chairman
 Shahida Nasreen, vice-chairman
 Sorowar Nizami, chief executive

Board of directors 

 Md. Golam Mawla
 A. K. M. Fazlul Haq
 Md. Shimul Hossain
 Fatema Wadud
 Md. Rafiqul Islam
 Md. Mozammel Haque
 Syeda Zarin Kabir

Researchers

References 

Legal research
Legal research institutes
Research in Bangladesh